The Caspian lamprey, Caspiomyzon wagneri, is a species of lamprey native to the Caspian Sea, and a member of the Petromyzontidae family. Eudontomyzon hellenicus and E. graecus (if separate from E. hellenicus) also possibly belong in this genus. This species is a non-parasitic lamprey that feeds on animal carcasses.

Description
Like other lampreys, it has no jaws, but it has a round oral disc surrounding the mouth. Inside this it has several radiating rows of tiny, backward-facing teeth. There is a single nostril near the eyes. There are no gill covers and the seven gill openings are visible just behind the head. The fish has no scales or paired fins, but has two elongated dorsal fins, the hindmost of which nearly joins onto the small tail fin. The Caspian lamprey is a silvery-grey colour.

Distribution
The Caspian lamprey is an anadromous fish which spends its adult life in the Caspian Sea and migrates up the Volga, Sura, and other rivers to spawn. It was at one time a common fish caught in nets and fish traps in the lower Volga for extracting fish oil and making candles and later for human consumption. In the early 1900s, 15 to 30 million fish were harvested annually from the lower Volga. It is now an uncommon fish because its migratory routes have been disrupted by dams and construction projects and it can no longer reach its spawning grounds.

Status
The Caspian lamprey is listed as "Near Threatened" in the IUCN Red List of Threatened Species. Damming of rivers in the mid-20th century has caused it to be cut off from its traditional spawning sites, but new sites have been found below the dams. The chief threat more recently has been the drying up of these streams caused by drought.

References 

Petromyzontidae
Fish of the Caspian Sea
Monotypic fish genera
Near threatened animals
Near threatened biota of Asia
Fish described in 1870